Holy Ground: NYC Live with the Wordless Music Orchestra is a live album by Japanese post-rock band Mono, released 27 April 2010 on Temporary Residence Limited. The album features a DVD of live footage and a CD with live recordings of the performance.

CD/DVD Track listing

References

External links
Holy Ground: NYC Live With The Wordless Music Orchestra at Pitchfork

2010 live albums
Mono (Japanese band) albums